Dangerous Liaisons is a 1988 American period romantic drama film directed by Stephen Frears from a screenplay by Christopher Hampton, based on his 1985 play Les liaisons dangereuses, itself adapted from the 1782 French novel of the same name by Pierre Choderlos de Laclos. 
It stars Glenn Close, John Malkovich, Michelle Pfeiffer, Uma Thurman, Swoosie Kurtz, Mildred Natwick, Peter Capaldi and Keanu Reeves.

Dangerous Liaisons was theatrically released by Warner Bros. Pictures on December 16, 1988. The film received generally positive reviews from critics, with praise for the performances by Close and Pfeiffer and the screenplay, production values and costumes. Grossing $34.7 million against its $14 million budget, it was a modest box-office success.
It received seven nominations at the 61st Academy Awards, including for the Best Picture, and won three: Best Adapted Screenplay, Best Costume Design, and Best Production Design.

Plot
In pre-Revolution Paris, the Marquise de Merteuil plots revenge against her ex-lover, the Comte de Bastide, who recently ended their relationship. To soothe her wounded pride and embarrass Bastide, she seeks to arrange the seduction and disgrace of his young virgin fiancée, Cécile de Volanges, who has only recently been presented to society after spending her formative years in the shelter of a convent.

Merteuil calls on the similarly unprincipled Vicomte de Valmont, another ex-lover of hers, to do the deed. Valmont declines, as he is plotting to seduce Madame de Tourvel, the wife of a member of Parliament away in Burgundy and a current houseguest of Valmont's aunt, Madame de Rosemonde. Amused and incredulous at Valmont's hubris in pursuing the chaste, devoutly religious Tourvel, Merteuil ups the ante: if Valmont somehow succeeds in seducing Tourvel and can furnish written proof, Merteuil will sleep with him as well. Never one to refuse a challenge, Valmont accepts.

Tourvel rebuffs all of Valmont's advances. Searching for leverage, he instructs his page Azolan to seduce Tourvel's maid Julie and gain access to Tourvel's private correspondence. One of the letters intercepted is from Cécile's mother and Merteuil's cousin, Madame de Volanges, warning Tourvel that Valmont is nefarious and untrustworthy. Valmont resolves to seduce Cécile as revenge for her mother's accurate denunciation of him.

At the opera, Cécile meets the charming and handsome Chevalier Raphael Danceny, who becomes her music teacher. They fall in love with coaxing from Merteuil, who knows that Danceny, a poor commoner, can never qualify as a bona fide suitor.

Valmont gains access to Cécile's bedchamber on a pretext, and sexually assaults her. As she pleads with him to leave, he blackmails her into giving up physical resistance, and the scene ends. On the pretext of illness, Cécile remains locked in her chambers, refusing all visitors. A concerned Madame de Volanges asks Merteuil to speak to Cécile; Cécile confides in Merteuil, naively assuming that she has Cécile's best interests at heart. Merteuil advises Cécile to welcome Valmont's advances; she says young women should take advantage of all the lovers they can acquire in a society so repressive and contemptuous of women. The result is a "student-teacher" relationship; by day, Cécile is courted by Danceny, and each night she receives a sexual "lesson" from Valmont. Merteuil begins an affair with Danceny.

After a night in Valmont's bed, Cécile miscarries his child. Meanwhile, Valmont has won Tourvel's heart, but at a cost: the lifelong bachelor playboy falls in love. In a fit of jealousy, Merteuil mocks Valmont and refuses to honor her end of their agreement unless Valmont breaks up with Tourvel. Valmont abruptly dismisses the latter with a terse excuse: "It's beyond my control." Overwhelmed with grief and shame, Tourvel retreats to a monastery where her health deteriorates rapidly.

Despite the breakup, Merteuil still refuses to honor the agreement and even declares "war". She informs Danceny that Valmont has been sleeping with Cécile. Danceny challenges Valmont to a duel, ending with the latter voluntarily running into Danceny's sword. With his dying breath, Valmont asks Danceny to communicate to Tourvel his true feelings for her; he also warns Danceny about Meurteuil and gives him his collection of intimate letters from her as proof of the veracity of his warnings.Valmont tells Danceny to circulate them after he has read them.

After hearing Valmont's message from Danceny, Tourvel dies. Merteuil goes to the opera but she is booed by her former friends and sycophants, implying that all of Paris have learned the full range of Merteuil's schemes and depredations due to Danceny’s circulation of the letters. She flees in disgrace. In the last shot we see her removing her makeup, alone.

Cast

 Glenn Close as Marquise Isabelle de Merteuil
 John Malkovich as Vicomte Sébastien de Valmont
 Michelle Pfeiffer as Madame Marie de Tourvel
 Uma Thurman as Cécile de Volanges
 Swoosie Kurtz as Madame de Volanges, mother of Cécile and cousin to Merteuil
 Keanu Reeves as Le Chevalier Raphael Danceny, suitor to Cécile
 Mildred Natwick as Madame de Rosemonde, Valmont's aunt
 Peter Capaldi as Azolan, Valmont's valet
 Valerie Gogan as Julie, Madame de Tourvel's chambermaid
 Laura Benson as Émilie, a courtesan
 Joe Sheridan as Georges, Madame de Tourvel's footman
 Joanna Pavlis as Adèle, Madame de Rosemonde's maid
 Harry Jones as Monsieur Armand
 François Montagut as Belleroche, Merteuil's lover

Production
Dangerous Liaisons was the first English-language film adaptation of Laclos's novel. The screenplay was based on Christopher Hampton's Olivier Award-winning and Tony Award-nominated theatrical adaptation for the Royal Shakespeare Company, directed by Howard Davies and featuring Lindsay Duncan, Alan Rickman and Juliet Stevenson.

The film was shot entirely on location in the Île-de-France region of northern France, and featured historical buildings such as the Château de Vincennes in Val-de-Marne, the Château de Champs-sur-Marne, the Château de Guermantes in Seine-et-Marne, the Château du Saussay in Essonne, and the Théâtre Montansier in Versailles.

Liaisons was the final film appearance of Academy Award and Tony Award-nominated actress Mildred Natwick. Drew Barrymore auditioned for the role of Cécile, and Sarah Jessica Parker turned it down before it was offered to Thurman. Annette Bening went through several auditions for the role of the courtesan Émilie, but in the end the role went to Laura Benson. Bening would go on to play the role of the Marquise de Merteuil in Miloš Forman's adaptation of Les Liaisons Dangereuses, Valmont, a year later.

During production Malkovich had an affair with Pfeiffer. His six-year marriage to actress Glenne Headly ended shortly thereafter.

Uma Thurman revealed she was really nervous about stripping for this film but agreed because she felt it was the right thing to do at the time. But she also said she was horrified by the "voyeuristic" way the scene appeared in the final cut of the movie.

Soundtrack
The score of Dangerous Liaisons was written by the British film music composer George Fenton. The soundtrack also includes works by a number of baroque and classical composers, reflecting the story's 18th-Century-French setting; pieces by Antonio Vivaldi, Johann Sebastian Bach, George Frideric Handel and Christoph Willibald Gluck feature prominently, although no French composers are included.

Reception

Critical response
Dangerous Liaisons holds a score of 94% on Rotten Tomatoes based on 31 reviews. On Metacritic it has a score of 74 based on 17 reviews, indicating "generally favorable reviews". Audiences surveyed by CinemaScore gave the film a grade B+ on scale of A to F.

Pauline Kael in The New Yorker described it as "heaven – alive in a way that movies rarely are." Hal Hinson in The Washington Post wrote that the film's "wit and immediacy is extraordinarily rare in a period film. Instead of making the action seem far off, the filmmakers put the audience in the room with their characters." Roger Ebert called it "an absorbing and seductive movie, but not compelling." Variety considered it an "incisive study of sex as an arena for manipulative power games." Vincent Canby in The New York Times hailed it as a "kind of lethal drawing-room comedy."

The Time Out reviewer wrote of Christopher Hampton's screenplay that "one of the film's enormous strengths is scriptwriter Christopher Hampton's decision to go back to the novel, and save only the best from his play". James Acheson and Stuart Craig were also praised for their work, with Sheila Benson of the Los Angeles Times stating that "the film's details of costuming (by The Last Emperor'''s James Acheson) and production design (by Stuart Craig of Gandhi and The Mission) are ravishing". All three would go on to win Academy Awards for their work on this film.

Glenn Close received considerable praise for her performance; she was lauded by The New York Times for her "richness and comic delicacy," while Mick LaSalle of the San Francisco Chronicle wrote that, once she "finally lets loose and gives way to complete animal despair, Close is horrifying." Roger Ebert thought the two lead roles were "played to perfection by Close and Malkovich... their arch dialogues together turn into exhausting conversational games, tennis matches of the soul."

Michelle Pfeiffer was widely acclaimed for her portrayal, despite playing, in the opinion of The Washington Post, "the least obvious and the most difficult" role. "Nothing is harder to play than virtue, and Pfeiffer is smart enough not to try. Instead, she embodies it." The New York Times called her performance a "happy surprise." Roger Ebert, considering the trajectory of her career, wrote that "in a year that has seen her in varied assignments such as Married to the Mob and Tequila Sunrise, the movie is more evidence of her versatility. She is good when she is innocent and superb when she is guilty." Pfeiffer would later win a British Academy Film Award for her performance.

The casting of John Malkovich proved to be a controversial decision that divided critics. The New York Times, while admitting there was the "shock of seeing him in powdered wigs", concluded that he was "unexpectedly fine. The intelligence and strength of the actor shape the audience's response to him". The Washington Post was similarly impressed with Malkovich's performance: "There's a sublime perversity in Frears' casting, especially that of Malkovich... [he] brings a fascinating dimension to his character that would be missing with a more conventionally handsome leading man." Variety was less impressed, stating that while the "sly actor conveys the character's snaky, premeditated Don Juanism... he lacks the devilish charm and seductiveness one senses Valmont would need to carry off all his conquests".

Uma Thurman gained recognition from critics and audiences; film critic Roger Ebert found her to be "well cast" in her "tricky" key role. At the time, insecure about her appearance, she spent roughly a year in London, during which she often wore loose, baggy clothing. Malkovich said of her, "There is nothing twitchy teenager-ish about her, I haven't met anyone like her at that age. Her intelligence and poise stand out. But there's something else. She's more than a little haunted."

Accolades

Related adaptations
Almost 25 years after he played Valmont, John Malkovich directed a French-language version of Hampton's play in Paris, which ran at the Théâtre de l'Atelier. In December 2012, the production was brought to Lansburgh Theatre by the Shakespeare Theatre Company for a limited run in Washington, D.C.

In 1989, the film Valmont was released starring Colin Firth, Annette Bening and Meg Tilly.

In 1999, the film Cruel Intentions set the same story in present-day America, starring Sarah Michelle Gellar, Ryan Phillippe and Reese Witherspoon.

In 2012, a Chinese version was released, starring Jang Dong-gun, Zhang Ziyi and Cecilia Cheung. It is loosely based on the novel itself and is set in 1930s Shanghai.

In 2018, the TV series The Great Seducer was released as a modern-day adaptation set in Korea starring Joy (singer), Moon Ga-young, Kim Min-jae (actor, born 1996) and Woo Do-hwan.

Dawn French and Jennifer Saunders parodied Dangerous Liaisons on their sketch show French & Saunders, which then inspired their 1999 comedy series Let Them Eat Cake''.

In 2022, the TV series Dangerous Liaisons premiered on premium television provider Starz. According to writer Harriet Warner, the series is loosely inspired by the novel and explores the marquise's life before the events of the play.

References

External links

 
 
 
 
 
 

1988 films
1980s erotic drama films
1980s historical romance films
1988 romantic drama films
Adultery in films
American erotic drama films
American films based on plays
American historical romance films
American romantic drama films
Best Foreign Film César Award winners
American erotic romance films
Films based on adaptations
Films based on French novels
Films based on works by Pierre Choderlos de Laclos
Films directed by Stephen Frears
Films scored by George Fenton
Films set in the 1780s
Films set in France
Films that won the Best Costume Design Academy Award
Films whose art director won the Best Art Direction Academy Award
Films whose writer won the Best Adapted Screenplay Academy Award
Films whose writer won the Best Adapted Screenplay BAFTA Award
Works based on Les Liaisons dangereuses
Warner Bros. films
1980s English-language films
1980s American films